The Yorkville Highlands AVA is an American Viticultural Area located in southern Mendocino County, California.  The Yorkville Highlands separate Sonoma County's Alexander Valley AVA from Mendocino County's Anderson Valley AVA.  The soil in the Yorkville Highlands is rocky with a high gravel content, which provides excellent drainage.  During the day, the climate is cooler than Alexander Valley but warmer than Anderson Valley, while at night the highlands are cooler than the surrounding areas.

See also
Mendocino County wine

References

External links 

 Yorkville Highlands Growers & Vintners Association
 Wine and Brews in the Anderson Valley

American Viticultural Areas
American Viticultural Areas of California
American Viticultural Areas of Mendocino County, California
1998 establishments in California